Gerolzhofen is a town in the district of Schweinfurt, Bavaria, Germany. The town is the former center of the district of Gerolzhofen and has about 7,000 inhabitants. The mayor of Gerolzhofen is Thorsten Wozniak (CSU).

Town partnerships
Gerolzhofen is twinned with:
  Mamers, France
  Sè, Benin
  Elek, Hungary
  Rodewisch, Germany
  Scarlino, Italy

Notable people
 Ludwig Derleth (1870-1948), writer (birthplace designated)
 Pia Beckmann (born 1963), politician (CSU), from 1 May 2002 to 30 April 2008 mayor of Würzburg
 Winfried Nöth (born 1944) is a German linguist and semiotician

References

Schweinfurt (district)